Matthew Morgenstern, also known as Moshe Morgenstern (born 1968 in London, United Kingdom), is an Israeli linguist and religious studies scholar known for his work on Eastern Aramaic languages, especially Mandaic. He is currently Full Professor in the Department of Hebrew Language and Semitic Linguistics at Tel Aviv University.

Education
Matthew Morgenstern was born in London in 1968. He obtained his B.A. degree in Social and Political Science from the University of Cambridge in 1990. In 1992, he received his Master of Arts degree in Aramaic Bible Translation from the Department of Hebrew and Jewish Studies at University College London. In the same year, he immigrated to Israel.

In Israel, he studied at the Hebrew University of Jerusalem, where he first obtained a Master of Arts degree in Hebrew Language in 1996. As a masters student, he was part of a research group that worked on the Dead Sea Scrolls. Morgenstern continued his doctoral studies at the Hebrew University of Jerusalem, where he received his doctorate (summa cum laude) in 2002 and completed a thesis titled The Aramaic Language in the Responsa of the Babylonian Geonim.

Career
From 2002 to 2013, he performed research and taught at the University of Haifa. From 2011 to 2012, he spent a sabbatical as a visiting professor at the Free University of Berlin. Today, he is employed as a full professor in the Department of Hebrew Culture at Tel Aviv University.

Research
Matthew Morgenstern is engaged in various fields of Semitic studies, especially Aramaic studies. His main focus is on Eastern Aramaic dialects, especially Jewish Babylonian Aramaic and Classical Mandaic. He is involved in the study of Mandaean manuscripts, as well as the photography, digitization, transcription, and translation of incantation bowls and amulets.

Morgenstern is currently working on a new dictionary of Mandaic.

Organizations
In 2013, Matthew Morgenstern co-founded the Society for Mandaean Studies, of which he is an elected board member.

Books

References

External links
Faculty page at Tel Aviv University
Academia.edu
Society for Mandaean Studies

1968 births
Living people
Academic staff of Tel Aviv University
Religious studies scholars
Scholars of Mandaeism
Israeli historians of religion
Hebrew University of Jerusalem alumni
Semiticists
Linguists from Israel
British emigrants to Israel
Israeli lexicographers
Translators from Aramaic
Translators from Mandaic